Bielanka may refer to:

Bielanka, Lower Silesian Voivodeship (south-west Poland)
Bielanka, Gorlice County in Lesser Poland Voivodeship (south Poland)
Bielanka, Nowy Targ County in Lesser Poland Voivodeship (south Poland)